Segun Oluwaniyi (born 24 April 1982 in Oyo State) is a Nigerian football (soccer) player currently with Shooting Stars F.C. of Nigeria.

Career

Youth
Oluwaniyi began 1998 to play football in the youth side for Villa Rock in Abuja and signed one year later for Osun United. After a successful year in the b-youth from Osun United was scouted by Niger Tornadoes, but he could not make the team and joined Gombe United F.C. after a half year.

Professional
In the 2001 season he started his professional career with Gombe United F.C. and in January 2004 joined Enugu Rangers. After two seasons with Rangers and 20 matches, he signed for Dolphins F.C. in December 2005. He was one of the leaders in his three and a half year by Dolphins F.C., but he signed in summer 2009 for Bayelsa United F.C.

International career
He made his full senior debut on March 3, 2010 as a starter in the 5–2 win over Congo DR.

References 

1982 births
Living people
Yoruba sportspeople
Sportspeople from Oyo State
Nigerian footballers
Shooting Stars S.C. players
Association football goalkeepers
Dolphin F.C. (Nigeria) players
Rangers International F.C. players
Gombe United F.C. players
Niger Tornadoes F.C. players
Nigeria international footballers